Allium consanguineum is a species of onion found high in the Himalayas of northern Pakistan and northern India. It is a perennial herb up to 35 cm tall, with an egg-shaped bulb. Leaves are flat, narrow. Umbels are hemispherical, densely crowded with many yellow or pink flowers.

References

consanguineum
Onions
Flora of Pakistan
Flora of West Himalaya
Plants described in 1843